Hard Times is the fifth album by singer, songwriter and pianist Peter Skellern (1947–2017)) released in 1975 on the Island Records label. Despite much radio airplay, "Hard Times" failed as a single and the LP slipped into decades of obscurity.  As a result of this commercial failure, Skellern changed record companies again, signing with Phonogram under their Mercury subsidiary and immediately enjoying a minor hit with a cover of "Love Is the Sweetest Thing". This album has now been officially re-issued on CD by Mint Audio Records on the 3 cd set, The Complete Island & Mercury Recordings.

Track listing
All tracks written by Peter Skellern except "Make Love, Not War" written by John Burrows, John Harding and Peter Skellern.

Side 1
"Hard Times”
"I Guess You Wish You’d Gone Home"
"Baby What a Fool I’ve Been”
"Down in the Cellar"
”Goodbye, America Keep You Well”

Side 2
"Snake Bite"
"Make Love, Not War” (From the musical revue Loud Reports)
"A Capella”
"Let’s Sleep Late"
"And Then You’ll Fall"

Personnel
Peter Skellern - vocals, acoustic and electric piano, percussion, organ and Moog
Rob Townsend - drums
George Ford - bass guitar
Mick Green, Brian Alterman - guitar
Chris Karan - tablas
Andrew Price Jackman - string arrangements
Madeline Bell, Joy Yates, Joanne Williams - backing vocals
George Harrison - guitar on "Make Love Not War"

Production
Producer: Meyer Shagaloff by arrangement with Johnny Stirling for Pendulum Music Ltd
Engineer: Trevor Vallis
Tape operators: Dave & Vaughan
Recorded at: Mayfair Sound Studios
Cover illustration: Tony Wright
Album design: Eckford Stimpson

References

1975 albums
Island Records albums
Peter Skellern albums